Volt Technical Resources is an American Recruitment/recruiting organization / employment agency based in New York City but with operations throughout North America. Volt Technical Resources is a business unit of Volt Workforce Solutions, a subsidiary of Volt Information Sciences (currently trading over-the-counter as VISI.) While Volt is best known for temporary, technical staffing services they also provide direct (Full Time) placement services. In June 2007, Volt was named #2 IT Staffing Company in the US by Staffing Industry Analysts. According to Staffing Industry Analysts, on January 11, 2013, the Securities and Exchange Commission announced it filed suit against Volt CFO Jack Egan, in a scheme to allegedly overstate revenue and mislead auditors. On Wednesday, January 26, 2011, the company was delisted from the New York Stock Exchange for failing to file its November 1, 2009 Form 10-K and certain other filings.

Competitors 
Primary competitors include:
 INT Technologies
 Excell Data Services
 Kelly Services
 Adecco
 Manpower
 Aquent

Microsoft and Volt relationship 
Most of the press that Volt receives is related to its close relationship with Microsoft. Most notably, in 2001/2002 Microsoft had significant issues regarding the employment of "permatemps". Their practice of hiring temporary employees through third-party agencies and then failing to convert them to full-time employees within a reasonable amount of time resulted in a class-action lawsuit against Microsoft and a subsequent settlement. As the primary provider of temporary workforce solutions for Microsoft, Volt picked up the majority of the attention related to this event.

This lawsuit had significant implications for the IT industry and the way that contract employees are hired. As a direct result of this suit, contractors at Microsoft are currently required to take a hiatus of six months from Microsoft positions that require building and network access after eighteen months as an agency temp (previously 100 days after 12 months). This policy applies to all agencies, not just Volt. Other companies also impose limits on the tenure of agency contractors.

References

Employment agencies of the United States